Werner Lake is a community in Kenora District, Ontario.

Werner Lake was the site of a mining and milling operation until 1976.  It was operated by Consolidated Canadian Faraday Ltd.  Over the summer of 1976 operations were shut down, most employees were let go, and summer students were kept on to help with the shut down.

Communities in Kenora District